Parramore Springs (formerly Paramore Spring) is a spring in Lake County, California.

Location

Spring

According to Gerald Ashley Waring, who visited the area around 1910,

References

Reference bibliography 

Springs of Lake County, California